Jorai Railway Station serves the areas of Jorai, Cooch Behar district in the Indian state of West Bengal. This station lies on the border of West Bengal and Assam.
The station lies on the New Jalpaiguri–New Bongaigaon section of Barauni–Guwahati line of Northeast Frontier Railway. This station falls under Alipurduar railway division.

References

Alipurduar railway division
Railway stations in West Bengal
Railway stations in Cooch Behar district